Multicore is a series of 32-bit microprocessors with embedded DSP cores developed by ELVEES, Russia. The microprocessor is a MIPS32 core (called RISCore32 by ELVEES; optionally with an FPU) or an ARM Cortex-A9 core. Some of the processors in the series are radiation hardened (rad-hard) for space applications.

Overview

Details

1892VM1Ya

CMOS process
HSBGA292 package

1892VM2Ya
 (MC-24)
2 cores: RISCore32 + ELcore-24 (DSP-core with SIMD architecture)
manufactured in a 250nm CMOS process
18 million transistors
HSBGA292 package

1892VM3T
 (MC-12)
2 cores: RISCore32 + ELcore-14 (DSP-core with SISD architecture)
manufactured in a 250nm CMOS process
18 million transistors
PQFP240 package

1892VM4Ya
 (MC-0226G, МЦОС)
3 cores: RISCore32 + 2x ELcore-26 (DSP-core with MIMD architecture)
manufactured in a foundry outside Russia in a 250nm CMOS process
26 million transistors
HSBGA416 package
includes 2 PCI controllers

1892VM5Ya
 (МС-0226, ЦПОС-02)
3 cores: RISCore32 + 2x ELcore-26 (DSP-core with MIMD architecture)
manufactured in a foundry outside Russia in a 250nm CMOS process
26 million transistors
HSBGA416 package
includes 1 PCI controller

1892VM7Ya
 (МС-0428)
130nm CMOS process, 81 million transistors
HSBGA765 package
includes 2 SpaceWire ports

1892VM8Ya
 (MC-24R)
manufactured by X-Fab Malaysia in a 250nm CMOS process and later by TSMC in a 40nm CMOS process (with the clock speed increased to 100 MHz)
HSBGA416 package
includes 2 SpaceWire ports; supports ECC memory

1892VM10Ya
 (NVCom-02T)
manufactured in a foundry outside Russia in a 130nm CMOS process
does not contain any IP blocks from outside Russia
50 million transistors
HSBGA400 package
includes 24-channel correlator for GPS / GLONASS

1892VM11Ya
 (NVCom-02)
manufactured by Angstrem in a 65nm CMOS process
BGA586 package
includes 24-channel correlator for GPS and GLONASS signals

1892VM12AT
 (MCT-03P)
manufactured in Zelenograd in a 180nm CMOS process
does not contain any IP blocks from outside Russia
CQFP240 package
includes 2 SpaceWire ports; supports ECC memory
radiation tolerance to not less than 300 kRad, working temperature from -60 to 85 °C

1892VM14Ya
 (MCom-02)
manufactured by TSMC in a 40nm CMOS process
HFCBGA 1296 package
includes 2 SpaceWire ports; hardware accelerators for H.264 and JPEG encoding; correlator for GPS and GLONASS signals

1892VM15AF
 (MC-30SF6)
manufactured in Zelenograd in a 180nm CMOS process
does not contain any IP blocks from outside Russia
CPGA720 package
includes 2 SpaceWire ports; supports ECC memory; hardware accelerators for FFT and JPEG encoding
power consumption 5 W
triple redundancy for registers; radiation tolerance to not less than 300 kRad, working temperature from -60 to 85 °C

1892VM16T

manufactured by Mikron Group in a 180nm CMOS process
CQFP240 package
working temperature from -60 to 85 °C

1892VM17F

manufactured by Mikron Group in a 180nm CMOS process
CPGA416 package
working temperature from -60 to 85 °C

1892VM18F

manufactured by Mikron Group in a 180nm CMOS process
CPGA720 package
working temperature from -60 to 85 °C

1892VM196

manufactured in Zelenograd in a 180nm process
does not contain any IP blocks from outside Russia
CPGA416 package
includes SpaceWire, ARINC 429, SPI, and CAN interfaces as well as a 12-bit, 100KHz ADC

1892VM206

manufactured in Zelenograd in a 180nm process
does not contain any IP blocks from outside Russia
CPGA720 package
includes SpaceWire, SpaceFibre, ARINC 429, AFDX, MIL-STD-1553, and CAN interfaces

1892VM226

includes SpaceWire and SpaceFibre interfaces

1892VM236

manufactured in Zelenograd in a 90nm process
includes SpaceWire interface

1892VM248
 (RoboDeus)
manufactured by TSMC in a 16nm process
intended for data centers and robotic systems
MIPI CSI and DSI interfaces (4K / 60fps), hardware accelerators for H.264 and HEVC
includes 10 Gigabit Ethernet, USB 3.1, HDMI, PCIe, and SATA interfaces

1892VA018
 (Scythian)
intended for smart cameras, robotic systems, industrial automation
MIPI CSI and DSI interfaces (4K / 60fps), hardware accelerators for H.264 and HEVC
GNSS signal processor
hardware accelerators for software-defined radios (FFT, Viterbi)
includes Gigabit Ethernet and USB 3.0 interfaces

1892VK016
 (MCT-04R)
manufactured in Russia in a 180nm CMOS process
CPGA720 package
intended for SSD controllers; includes SpaceWire and SpaceFibre interfaces; ECC for internal and external memory
radiation tolerance to not less than 200 kRad, working temperature from -60 to 85 °C

1892VK024
 (MCT-07R)
manufactured in a 180nm CMOS process
includes SpaceFibre, MIL-STD-1553, and I²C interfaces as well as an 8-channel, 12-bit 200kHz ADC

1892KP1Ya
 (MCK-022)
manufactured in a CMOS process
HSBGA-416 package
includes 16-port SpaceWire router
working temperature from -60 to 85 °C

1892KhD2Ya
 (MCK-01)
manufactured in a CMOS process
HSBGA-416 package
includes 16-port SpaceWire router

See also
 Soviet integrated circuit designation

References

External links
 Official site of ELVEES Multicore (In Russian)

MIPS implementations
Radiation-hardened microprocessors
32-bit microprocessors
64-bit microprocessors